The Niobid Painter was an ancient Athenian vase painter in the red-figure style who was active from approximately 470 to 450 BC. He is named after a calyx krater which shows the god Apollo and his sister Artemis killing the children of Niobe, who were collectively called the Niobids. The krater is known as the Niobid Krater and is now housed at the Louvre in Paris. In his other work he shows a preference for Amazonomachy scenes and three-quarter-view faces. His student Polygnotos continued his style of vase painting.

Name vase 

The massacre of the Niobids by Apollo and Artemis is shown on side B of the Niobid Krater. This story is rarely represented in Greek art. Niobe had bragged that she was superior to the goddess Leto because she had seven boys and seven girls, while Leto was mother to just two children, Apollo and Artemis. To punish Niobe for her hubris, Leto sent Apollo and Artemis to kill all of Niobe's children with arrows.

It is uncertain what is being depicted on side A as none of the figures is labeled. Only Heracles and Athena are clearly recognized. There are several hypotheses about what the other figures represent. One option is that they are the Argonauts awaiting favorable winds in Iolcos. Alternatively the scene depicts the episode of Heracles' descent into Hades to rescue Theseus and Pirithous, who were guilty of an attempted abduction of Persephone. Another possibility is that Heracles is a statue and that the men surrounding him are Athenian soldiers who wish to place themselves  under the protection of the divine hero before the Battle of Marathon. The Athenians attributed their victory in that battle to the support of Heracles and instituted a cult to him.

A single arrow in the lower right corner of side B probably protrudes from a dead Niobid hidden behind the landscape. The implied presence of a body which is not actually represented was a remarkable novelty in vase painting. The Niobid Painter also attempted to draw the scenes in three dimensional space by adding multiple levels to the landscape where the scenes take place. This change was inspired by contemporary wall and panel paintings which also used multiple level compositions. However, this feature did not become popular in vase painting and the rest of the Niobid Painter's work used a single groundline.

Other vases 
 The Gela Krater, a volute krater with an Amazonomachy scene in the Museo archeologico regionale di Agrigento, Italy
 A volute krater with an Amazonomachy scene in the Museo Archeologico Nazionale di Napoli, Italy
 A calyx krater showing the creation of Pandora in the British Museum
 An amphora with a scene of Sappho teaching music in the Walters Art Museum, United States

References

Sources

External links

 The Niobid Krater, the painter's name vase, in the Louvre
 The Gela Krater in the archeological museum of Agrigento
 Calyx krater in British Museum
 Amphora in Walters Art Museum

5th-century BC Athenians
Ancient Greek vase painters
Anonymous artists of antiquity